Milea (also Milia, meaning "appletree") is a village in the municipal unit of Tolofon, Phocis, Greece. The population is 109 (2011).

References

Populated places in Phocis